Nopal (from the Nahuatl word   for the pads of the plant) is a common name in Spanish for Opuntia cacti (commonly referred to in English as prickly pear), as well as for its pads.

There are about 114 known species in Mexico, where it is a common ingredient in numerous Mexican cuisine dishes. The nopal pads can be eaten raw or cooked, used in marmalades, soups, stews and salads, as well as being used for traditional medicine or as fodder for animals. Farmed nopales are most often of the species Opuntia ficus-indica or Opuntia matudae although the pads of almost all Opuntia species are edible.

Nopales are generally sold fresh in Mexico, cleaned of thorns, and sliced to the customer's desire on the spot. They can also be found canned or bottled as nopalitos, and less often dried, especially for export. Cut into slices or diced into cubes, nopales have a light, slightly tart flavor, like green beans, and a crisp, mucilaginous texture.  In most recipes, the mucilaginous liquid they contain is included in the cooking.  They are at their most tender and juicy in the spring.

Nopales are most commonly used in Mexican cuisine in dishes such as huevos con nopales "eggs with nopal", carne con nopales "meat with nopal", tacos de nopales, in salads with tomato, onion, and queso panela (panela cheese), or simply on their own as a side vegetable.  Nopales have also grown to be an important ingredient in New Mexican cuisine and in Tejano culture of Texas.

Nutrition 

Per US cup serving, nopal fruit is an excellent source of the dietary mineral manganese (20% of the Daily Value, DV) and a good source of vitamin C (13% DV), magnesium (11% DV) and calcium (14% DV), with nutrient content improving as the plant matures.  Its calcium may not be biologically available because it is present as calcium oxalate, a non-absorbable complex in the small intestine.

Economic value 

The nopal cactus grows extensively throughout Mexico, being especially abundant in the central Mexican arid and semi arid regions. There are three typical ways to cultivate nopal cacti — commercial plantations, family farms and gardens, or in the wild. In 1996 there were  prickly pear farmers, as well as around 8000 general nopal farmers, with all of the people involved in the processing industries and in cochineal production, employing a significant number of the Mexican population. Nopal is grown in eighteen of the Mexican states with 74% in the Distrito Federal, with an annual yield of  tons of both the tuna and the pads. The farming of nopal provides many subsistence communities with employment, food, income, and allows them to remain on their land.

Detection of the cactus-eating moth Cactoblastis cactorum in Mexico in 2006 caused anxiety among the country's phytosanitary authorities, as this insect can be potentially devastating for the cactus industry. In 1925, the same insect was successfully used in Australia to control the quickly growing population of cactus, which had become an invasive species after its introduction.

Gallery

See also 
 Nopaltilla
 Okra

References 

Aztec society
Mexican cuisine
Natural history of Mesoamerica
New Mexican cuisine
Opuntia
Stem vegetables

es:Nopal
nah:Nohpalli